Mount Abel may refer to:

 Mount Abel (British Columbia) in British Columbia, Canada
 the former name of Cerro Noroeste in California, USA